Upwey may refer to:
Upwey, Dorset, England
Upwey, Victoria, Australia